Amrita Lal Basu (1853–1929)  was a playwright and stage actor of Calcutta. He was one of the pioneers of the public theatre in Bengal in British era. He is well known for his farces and satirical plays.

His works include
Byapika Biday (1926)
Dvande Matanam (1926). d. Anantatanay (Dattatray Anant Apte) (b. 1879)
Tiltarpan (1881)
Bibaha Bibhrat (1884)
Taru-Bala (1891)
Kalapani (1892)
Bimata (1893)
Adarsha Bandhu (1900)
Avatar (1902)
Babu (1893)
Chorer Upar Batpari

Education
He graduated from the General Assembly's Institution (now the Scottish Church College), before proceeding to the Calcutta Medical College, from where he dropped out after two years of study.

References

External links

19th-century Indian dramatists and playwrights
1929 deaths
1853 births
Bengali theatre personalities
Bengali male actors
Indian male stage actors
Indian theatre directors
Male actors from Kolkata
Oriental Seminary alumni
Scottish Church College alumni
University of Calcutta alumni
19th-century Indian male actors
20th-century Indian male actors
Indian male dramatists and playwrights
Writers from Kolkata
19th-century Indian male writers
Dramatists and playwrights from West Bengal